Ayyampalayam may refer to several places:
Ayyampalayam, Dindigul, a town in Dindigul district, Tamil Nadu, India
Ayyampalayam, Erode, a village in Erode district, Tamil Nadu, India
 Ayyampalayam, Karur, a village in India